Adrion "Pee Wee" Smith (born September 29, 1971) was a football player in the CFL for twelve years. Smith played defensive back for the Hamilton Tiger-Cats, Memphis Mad Dogs and Toronto Argonauts from 1994–2005. He was a CFL All-Star four times and won three Grey Cup Championships (1996, 1997 and 2004) with the Argos. Smith was noted for occasionally playing quarterback as well as returning punts. As such, he was considered relatively versatile. He played college football at Southwest Missouri State University. In 2007, he was a radio analyst for the Argonauts.  In 2008, Smith was a CFL analyst on Rogers Sportsnet. In 2011, Smith married Denise Warriner and they share three children together, Makayla, Kiondre and Charlize. In 2022, Kiondre followed in his father's footsteps and was drafted into the CFL by the Hamilton Tigercats.

External links

 Rogers Sportsnet bio
 Missouri State Bears bio

1971 births
Living people
Players of American football from Kansas City, Missouri
Players of Canadian football from Kansas City, Missouri
African-American players of Canadian football
American emigrants to Canada
Canadian football defensive backs
Canadian Football League announcers
Hamilton Tiger-Cats players
Memphis Mad Dogs players
Missouri State University alumni
Toronto Argonauts players
21st-century African-American sportspeople
20th-century African-American sportspeople